David Rubin may refer to:

David Rubin (academic administrator), former dean and professor of communications of S. I. Newhouse School of Public Communications
David Rubin (psychologist), professor of psychology at Duke University
David Rubin (casting director), American casting director, president of AMPAS
Dave Rubin (born 1976), American conservative political commentator, comedian, and host of The Rubin Report
David Rubin (writer) (1924–2008), American novelist and translator
David Rubin (activist), American-Israeli activist
David S. Rubin (born 1949), American curator, art critic, and artist
David T. Rubin (born 1968), American gastroenterologist

See also 
David Reuben (disambiguation)